Angels Landing, known previously as the Temple of Aeolus, is a  tall rock formation in Zion National Park in southwestern Utah, United States. A renowned trail cut into solid rock in 1926 leads to the top of Angels Landing and provides panoramic views of Zion Canyon.

Trail
The hike is rated as a class 3 difficulty based on the Yosemite Decimal System. It begins at the Grotto drop off point on the park's shuttle system, which operates from early spring through late fall. It roughly follows the path of the Virgin River for some time along the West Rim Trail, slowly gaining elevation in sandy terrain. Most of the trail is uphill on the way up to Angels Landing. As the trail gets steeper and leaves behind the river, it becomes paved. After a series of steep switchbacks, the trail goes through the area between Angels Landing and the Zion Canyon that is a gradual ascent. Walter's Wiggles, a series of 21 steep switchbacks, are the last hurdle before Scout Lookout. The wiggles are named after Walter Ruesch, who was the first superintendent for Zion National Park and constructed the switchbacks in 1926.

Scout Lookout is generally the turnaround point for those who are unwilling to make the final summit push to the top of Angels Landing. The last half-mile of the trail is strenuous and lined with numerous sharp drop offs and narrow paths.

The half-mile section up the spine, the Angels Landing Trail-West Rim Trail, was listed in the National Register of Historic Places in 1987.
 
As of March 15, 2021, 13 people have died from falling while hiking the trail since 2000.

In July 2018, the trail was closed following damage due to a severe storm and was re-opened in September 2018.

Beginning in 2022, hikers will be required to have a permit.  Zion National Park wants to improve visitor experiences, protect the park and increase the safety of the hike. One of the main reasons is that the route has been overcrowded in recent years. In addition to a day-before lottery, there will be a quarterly seasonal lottery for which people can register.

Climate
Spring and fall are the most favorable seasons to visit Angels Landing. According to the Köppen climate classification system, it is located in a Cold semi-arid climate zone, which is defined by the coldest month having an average mean temperature below 32 °F (0 °C), and at least 50% of the total annual precipitation being received during the spring and summer.

Climbing routes
Climbing Routes on Angels Landing include:
 Prodigal Son - V  C2 - 9 pitches
 Lowe Route - IV/V  C3 - 13 pitches
 Northeast Buttress - IV  - 8 pitches
 South Face - II  - 3 pitches
 Ball and Chain - V  A0 - 9 pitches
 Angels Hair - V  - 11 pitches

Gallery

See also
 Great White Throne

References

External links

SummitPost
AllTrails
Angel's Landing Photos and Trip Report 2012
Angels Landing winter hike and trip report, February 2010
Angel's Landing trip report

Rock formations of Utah
Historic American Engineering Record in Utah
Landforms of Washington County, Utah
Zion National Park